Damion Hall, also known as Damion "Crazy Legs" Hall is an American R&B singer. He is a member of the new jack swing group Guy and is the brother of Guy member, Aaron Hall. He has released one solo album, Straight to the Point in 1994, which spawned one single, "Satisfy You", featuring Chanté Moore. That song managed to reach No. 48 on the Billboard R&B charts. He is currently unsigned but managed by celebrity and sports manager Glenn Toby.

Discography
Straight to the Point (1994)

References

1968 births
Living people
American contemporary R&B singers
People from the Bronx
20th-century African-American male singers